Copper Coast Highway is a highway in South Australia which branches off from the Augusta and Port Wakefield Highways 2 km north of Port Wakefield, and heads northwest across the top of Yorke Peninsula to Kadina, ending at the Spencer Gulf town of Wallaroo.

Improvements
In 2016, the state government proposed to restructure the intersection on the Copper Coast Highway at the north end of the Yorke Highway to provide a large roundabout instead of Yorke Highway terminating at a tee-junction. The roundabout is intended to reduce delays at the end of holiday periods when many people try to drive back towards Adelaide at the same time, and will permit road trains to operate between Port Wakefield and Ardrossan which had previously not been permitted due to limitations of that intersection. Subsidiary works improved the Yorke Highway north of Ardrossan with a widened bridge, sealed shoulders and overtaking lanes. Work commenced on the roundabout in October 2017 and it was completed in January 2018.

A proposal by the Liberal Party of Australia before the 2018 state election was that if it was elected it would build a single lane overpass at the Port Wakefield end of the Copper Coast Highway to reduce traffic conflicts. The party won the election and upgraded the planning to completely grade-separate the intersection. The contract for detailed design and construction of duplication of the highway through Port Wakefield and a grade-separated intersection with the Augusta and Port Wakefield Highways was let in March 2020 to the Port Wakefield to Port Augusta Alliance (a consortium of CPB Contractors, Aurecon and GHD Group, also responsible for the duplication of Joy Baluch AM Bridge in Port Augusta), with the government announcing an overpass for the intersection with the Augusta and Port Wakefield Highways in 2021. Project construction commenced in late 2020, with completion expected in 2022; the overpass opened in December 2021, four months ahead of schedule.

Major intersections and towns

References

Yorke Peninsula
Highways in South Australia